The black bushbird (Neoctantes niger) is a species of insectivorous bird in the antbird family Thamnophilidae. It is monotypic within the genus Neoctantes. It is found in Brazil, Colombia, Ecuador, and Peru. Its natural habitat is subtropical or tropical moist lowland forests.

The black bushbird was described by the Austrian ornithologist August von Pelzeln in 1859 and given the binomial name Xenops niger. The current genus Neoctantes was erected by the English zoologist Philip Sclater in 1869.

References

black bushbird
Bushbirds
Birds of the Amazon Basin
Birds of the Colombian Amazon
Birds of the Ecuadorian Amazon
Birds of the Peruvian Amazon
black bushbird
Taxonomy articles created by Polbot